The Late Basketmaker II Era (AD 50 to 500) was a cultural period of Ancient Pueblo People when people began living in pit-houses, raised maize and squash, and were proficient basket makers and weavers.  They also hunted game and gathered wild foods, such as pinyon nuts.

The Early and Late Basketmaker II Eras (Pecos Classification) are often described as one "Basketmaker period". It is preceded by the Early Basketmaker II Era, and is followed by the Basketmaker III Era.

Communities
The primary dwellings of this era were round or circular pit-houses that were built on open land and partially below the ground surface.  The entrance to the house faced east or south.  Logs and rocks were often used for the dwellings foundation.  The building materials for the walls could include stacked logs, jacal or poles and brush.  In the center of the dwelling was a fire pit.

Some early people built their dwellings within the natural protection of rock shelters, especially during the beginning of this period.

Agriculture
The Basketmaker II people raised maize and squash, the first people of the northern American southwest to do so, which required them to be located near sources of water and good soil.  Carbon isotope analysis of bones of Archaic people compared to Basketmakers indicates that the Basketmakers' diet was rich in maize.

Manos and metates were used to grind maize and other foods. Food was stored below ground in storage cists, often lined with slabs of stone.

Material goods
Excavated items from this period include: 
 good quality, tightly woven baskets
 woven yucca bags, sandals and blankets
 robes and blankets made of feather and fur
 stone projectile points, scrapers and knives
 atlatl and throwing spears (the main tools for hunting)
 bone stitching awls, whistles, and gaming pieces
 cord made from yucca and cedar bark
 oval-shaped cradles
 stone pipes

About AD 200, the middle of this period, there was some experimentation with a crude form of brown pottery.

Cultural groups and periods
The cultural groups of this period include:
 Ancestral Puebloans – southern Utah, southern Colorado, northern Arizona and northern and central New Mexico.
 Mogollon – southeastern Arizona, southern New Mexico and northern Mexico.
 Patayan – western Arizona, California and Baja California.

Notable Late Basketmaker II sites
 Chaco Culture National Historical Park – New Mexico
 Darkmold Site – Colorado
 Durango Rock Shelters Archeology Site – Colorado (Basketmaker II type site)
 Glen Canyon – Utah and Arizona
 Hovenweep National Monument – Colorado
 Petrified Forest National Park – Arizona
 Virgin Anasazi – Colorado Plateau of Nevada, Utah and Arizona

References

Further reading
 Reed, Paul F. (2000) Foundations of Anasazi Culture: The Basketmaker Pueblo Transition. University of Utah Press. .
 Stuart, David E.; Moczygemba-McKinsey, Susan B. (2000) Anasazi America: Seventeen Centuries on the Road from Center Place. University of New Mexico Press. .
 Wenger, Gilbert R. The Story of Mesa Verde National Park. Mesa Verde Museum Association, Mesa Verde National Park, Colorado, 1991 [1st edition 1980].  .

Native American history of Arizona
Native American history of Colorado
Native American history of Nevada
Native American history of New Mexico
Native American history of Utah
Oasisamerica cultures
Pueblo history
Southwest periods in North America by Pecos classification